Johnson Prairie is a census-designated place (CDP) in Cherokee County, Oklahoma, United States. It was first listed as a CDP prior to the 2020 census. It includes the unincorporated community of Liberty.

The CDP is in northern Cherokee County, bordered to the north by Teresita, to the east by Lowrey, and to the south by Moodys.

Demographics

References 

Census-designated places in Cherokee County, Oklahoma
Census-designated places in Oklahoma